Cathedral Square may refer to:

Cathedral Square at St John's Cathedral (Brisbane) Australia
Cathedral Square, Christchurch, New Zealand
Cathedral Square, Gibraltar
Cathedral Square, Glasgow, Scotland
Cathedral Square, Letterkenny, Ireland
Cathedral Square, Moscow, Russia
Cathedral Square Park, Milwaukee, Wisconsin, United States
Cathedral Square, Mobile, Alabama, United States
Cathedral Square, Perth, Australia
Cathedral Square, Vilnius, Lithuania
Praça da Sé, São Paulo, Brazil
Cathedral Square station, a light rail station on Sacramento, California, United States

See also
Cathedral Road (disambiguation)
Piazza del Duomo (disambiguation)